Edward Taylor (31 October 1921 – 24 October 1982) was Archdeacon of Warwick from 1974 until his death.

Education

Taylor was educated at King's College London and St Boniface College, Warminster.
Career

Army Service

During World War Two

Taylor joined the British Army in 1940. He was an officer in the 14th Punjab Regiment from 1942 to 1945.

After World War Two

In 1946 he was appointed an honorary Captain in the Duke of Wellington's Regiment.

Ecclesiastical career

Early career

Taylor was ordained Deacon in 1949, and Priest in 1950. After a curacy in Diss he was Vicar of St Paul, Stockingford from 1951 to 1957 then  St Nicholas, Radford, Coventry from 1957 to 1964.

Later posts

He was Rector of Spernall with Morton Bagot and Oldberrow from 1965 to 1974; Priest in charge of Coughton with Sambourne from 1965 to 1974 (Vicar, 1970 to 1974.
In 1975 he became Vicar of Sherbourne, Warwickshire, and lived at The Archdeacon's House there until his death.

References

1921 births
1982 deaths
Alumni of King's College London
Duke of Wellington's Regiment officers
20th-century English Anglican priests
Archdeacons of Warwick
Punjab Regiment officers
Alumni of St Boniface Missionary College, Warminster